Vimcontu Broadcasting Corporation is a Philippine radio network of the Visayas-Mindanao Confederation of Trade Unions, a trade union organization under the Associated Labor Unions (ALU) through the Trade Union Congress of the Philippines. Its corporate office is located at the 2nd Floor, JSU-PSU Mariners' Court-Cebu, ALU-VIMCONTU Welfare Center, Pier 1, Cebu City.

Vimcontu Stations

AM Stations

FM Stations

References

Philippine radio networks